Leuchs is a surname of German origin. People with that name include:

 Hermann Leuchs (1879-1945), German organic chemist
 Leuchs anhydride, a class of chemical compounds
 Kashi Leuchs (born 1978), New Zealand cross country mountain biker
 Jean Leuchs (born 1995), Brazilian Brewer

See also
 Leuch, a surname
 

Surnames of German origin